Otothyropsis alicula is a species of catfish in the family Loricariidae. It is native to South America, where it occurs in the Santo Antônio River, a tributary of the Sapucaí River, which is itself a tributary of the Rio Grande and part of Brazil's Paraná River basin. The species reaches 3.6 cm (1.4 inches) SL and was described in 2014 by Beatriz G. Lippert, Bárbara B. Calegari, and Roberto E. Reis on the basis of morphology and coloration.

References 

Otothyrinae